The Jackson's barb (Enteromius jacksoni) is a species of cyprinid fish.

It is found in Kenya, Tanzania, and Uganda.
Its natural habitats are rivers, intermittent rivers, and inland deltas.
It is not considered a threatened species by the IUCN.

The fish is named in honor of Frederick John Jackson (1859-1929), an English administrator, explorer and ornithologist, who secured the type specimen.

References

Enteromius
Cyprinid fish of Africa
Fish described in 1889
Taxa named by Albert Günther
Taxonomy articles created by Polbot